Ahmed Muhtar Pasha (‎ 1 November 1839 – 21 January 1919) was a prominent Ottoman field marshal and Grand Vizier, who served in the Crimean and Russo-Turkish wars. Ahmed Muhtar Pasha was appointed as Grand Vizier in July 1912 at age 72, largely due to his prestige as an old military hero.

Biography

Early life and military career
Ahmed Muhtar was born on 1 November 1839 to a Turkish family in Bursa in the Ottoman Empire and was educated in the Ottoman Military College in Istanbul. His father was merchant Halil Efendi. He eventually became professor and then governor of the school.

In 1856, he served as an adjutant during the Crimean War. In 1862, he was a staff officer in the disastrous Montenegrin campaign. Between 1870 and 1871, he quelled rebellions in Yemen. He gained the titles of Pasha and Marshal and, in 1873, was made commander of the Second Army Corps, holding the position until 1876. During the 1875 uprisings in Bosnia and Herzegovina, he assumed control of the Turkish forces there. On the outbreak of the Russo-Turkish War, 1877-1878, he was sent to take charge of operations in Erzurum. Although the Russians ultimately defeated the Ottomans in the war, Muhtar's victories against them in the eastern front won him the title Gazi ("The Victorious").

In 1879, Ahmed Muhtar Pasha was appointed the commander of the Ottoman Empire's frontier with Greece, before being sent in 1885 to serve as the Ottoman High Commissioner in Egypt.

Later life and premiership ("Great Cabinet")

Ahmed Muhtar Pasha was appointed as Grand Vizier in July 1912 at age 72, largely due to his prestige as an old military hero. His premiership was a result of the Savior Officers forcing the dissolution of the previous Committee of Union and Progress (CUP) government under Grand Vizier Mehmed Said Pasha. The Savior Officers were partisans of the opposition Freedom and Accord Party (also known as the Liberal Union or Entente) who felt cheated after the infamous 1912 elections, known as the "Election of Clubs", in which the CUP had employed electoral fraud and violence to gain 269 of the 275 seats in the Chamber of Deputies (the popularly elected lower house of the national General Assembly) while leaving only 6 to the opposition.

The non-party, independent cabinet formed by Ahmed Muhtar Pasha was known as the "Great Cabinet" because it included three former Grand Viziers as ministers and sometimes as the "Father-Son Cabinet" because it included Ahmed Muhtar Pasha's son, Mahmud Muhtar Pasha, as Minister of the Navy. Because the Great Cabinet did not include any members of the CUP, rumors began to spread that the government would dissolve the Chamber of Deputies, which was dominated by CUP after the fraudulent 1912 elections. A few days after Ahmed Muhtar Pasha took office, the Savior Officers sent a letter of threat to the President of the Chamber of Deputies (and CUP member), Halil Bey, demanding that the Chamber be dissolved for new elections within 48 hours. The CUP members in the Chamber condemned and censured this threat. However, thanks to a law he had passed through the Senate, Ahmed Muhtar Pasha was able, with the sultan's support, to dissolve the Chamber with ease on 5 August.

After the dissolution of the Chamber, the First Balkan War erupted early in October 1912, catching Ahmed Muhtar Pasha's administration off-guard. Martial law was declared, and Ahmed Muhtar Pasha resigned as Grand Vizier on 29 October after just four months in the premier's office.

Death
Ahmed Muhtar Pasha died in Istanbul on 21 January 1919 at the age of 79. His son Mahmud Muhtar Pasha was also a high-ranking commander in the Ottoman Army and the Minister of the Navy in Ahmed Muhtar Pasha's own government. After the proclamation of the Republic of Turkey, the Turkish government published a postage stamp with his image to honor his legacy.

See also
 1912 Ottoman general election
 List of Ottoman grand viziers

References

Notes

Sources

External links 

  (PDF version)

1839 births
1919 deaths
Ottoman Military Academy alumni
Ottoman Military College alumni
Ottoman Army generals
Pashas
Ottoman military personnel of the Russo-Turkish War (1877–1878)
Ottoman military personnel of the Crimean War
Ottoman governors of Crete
Field marshals of the Ottoman Empire
Ottoman people of the Italo-Turkish War
Ottoman people of the Balkan Wars
20th-century Grand Viziers of the Ottoman Empire
Astronomers from the Ottoman Empire
19th-century astronomers
20th-century astronomers
Honorary Knights Grand Cross of the Order of St Michael and St George